The Karpalak ambush, referred to by Macedonians as the Karpalak massacre, was an attack carried out by the National Liberation Army (NLA) against a convoy of the Army of the Republic of Macedonia (ARM) near the village of Grupčin on 8 August 2001 amidst an ethnic Albanian insurgency in the country, in the final stages of the Yugoslav Wars. It was speculated that the ambush was carried out in retaliation for a Macedonian Police raid in Skopje the day before in which five NLA insurgents were killed. Ten members of the ARM's Military Reserve Force, including two officers, were killed at Karpalak and two others were wounded. The ambush was the single deadliest incident of the conflict up until that point.

Shortly after the ambush, the Macedonian Air Force flew combat aircraft over Karpalak in a show of force and bombed predominantly Albanian villages on the outskirts of the nearby town of Tetovo. The attack was also followed by anti-Albanian riots in Prilep, home to all ten of the fallen reservists, in which multiple Albanian-owned properties were damaged or destroyed, including a mosque. The deaths of the reservists prompted Macedonian president Boris Trajkovski to dismiss the ARM's chief of staff from his post, the fourth such dismissal in less than two months. Several days later, Macedonian government officials and representatives of the NLA signed the Ohrid Agreement, paving the way for an end to the conflict.

In the years following the ambush, the Macedonian government has commissioned several plaques commemorating the fallen reservists, which have become the frequent target of vandals. This has prompted complaints from veterans' organizations that the government has not done enough to ensure the reservists are properly commemorated.

Background
Amidst the disintegration of Yugoslavia, the federal republic of Macedonia held a referendum on 8 September 1991—largely boycotted by the ethnic Albanian minority—in which most of its inhabitants voted in favour of independence. Following the referendum, Macedonia's legislature declared its independence, although in effect, the republic de facto remained a part of Yugoslavia. The following year, the Macedonian political leadership negotiated the peaceful withdrawal of the Yugoslav People's Army (JNA) in exchange for local JNA units being permitted to take all their equipment with them. Macedonia thus became the only federal republic to secede from Yugoslavia non-violently.

In early 2001, the ethnic Albanian rebel militia known as the National Liberation Army (NLA) commenced an insurgency against the Macedonian government. Although many of its fighters were Albanians from other parts of the Balkans, the NLA maintained that 80 percent were originally from Macedonia. On 7 August 2001, the Macedonian Police carried out a raid in Skopje targeting a rebel cell allegedly planning attacks in the capital. Five rebels were killed during the raid and the police confiscated a cache of weapons.

Ambush
On Wednesday, 8 August 2001, a convoy transporting members of the ARM's Military Reserve Force was ambushed by the NLA outside the village of Grupčin, near the locale of Karpalak, on the highway between Skopje and Tetovo. The reservists had been on their way to reinforce a military base in Tetovo. One of the ARM trucks was struck by a rocket-propelled grenade. Those who did not burn to death in the resulting explosion were shot as they attempted to escape the vehicle. In total, ten ARM reservists were killed in the ambush. Among the dead were two officers. Two soldiers were wounded. The fallen reservists were later identified as Nane Naumoski, Sašo Kitanoski, Goran Minoski, Erdovan Šabanoski, Ljube Grujoski, Branko Sekuloski, Darko Veljanoski, Pece Sekuloski, Vebi Rušitoski and Marko Despotoski. All were from Prilep, a town in central Macedonia.

The ambush was the single deadliest attack of the conflict up until that point. It was speculated that it may have been carried out as retribution for the police killing of five NLA insurgents in Skopje a day earlier.

Aftermath

Anti-Albanian incidents
Macedonia's chief prosecutor, visited the scene of the attack shortly after it occurred. In direct response to it, the ARM deployed additional reinforcements to Tetovo, including ten main battle tanks, as well as multiple trucks loaded with soldiers. Combat aircraft later flew over Karpalak in a show of force. The day after the ambush, the ten reservists were buried with military honours at a Prilep cemetery, their coffins draped in the flag of Macedonia. "[The] Albanians will rot in hell," one father exclaimed as he sobbed over his son's coffin. The same day, Trajkovski dismissed the ARM's chief of staff, General Pande Petrovski. He was succeeded by his deputy, General Metodij Stamboliski, marking the fourth such change of the ARM's senior leadership in less than two months. A night of rioting ensued in which ethnic Macedonians burned the Čarši Mosque in Prilep, as well as multiple ethnic Albanian homes. Macedonia's Defence Minister, Vlado Buckovski, appealed for the rioters to show restraint and refrain from attacking Albanian-owned properties. 

On 10 August, Macedonian Air Force Sukhoi Su-25 ground attack aircraft bombed predominantly Albanian villages on the outskirts of Tetovo. The same day, eight additional Macedonian soldiers were killed after their vehicle drove over a landmine near the predominantly Albanian village of Ljuboten. The loss of eighteen soldiers in such a short time "had a tremendous psychological impact in a nation of two million inhabitants," the journalist John Phillips wrote. On 12 August, the Macedonian Police attacked Ljuboten and extrajudicially killed ten ethnic Albanians. Macedonian Minister of the Interior Ljube Boškoski and his assistant Johan Tarčulovski were later charged with crimes against humanity by the International Tribunal for the former Yugoslavia (ICTY) in relation to this action. In 2008, Boškoski was acquitted on all counts, whereas Tarčulovski was found guilty and sentenced to twelve years' imprisonment. Both men's first-instance verdicts were upheld by the ICTY in 2010.

Ohrid Agreement
The Karpalak ambush, as well as the landmine explosion at Ljuboten, coincided with ongoing peace negotiations between the Macedonian government and representatives of the country's ethnic Albanian minority. "This is clearly a setback for the peace process," U.S. envoy James Pardew remarked, referring to the recent Macedonian casualties, "but it is critical that this agreement is signed on Monday." On Monday, 13 August 2001, government officials met with representatives of the country's two largest ethnic Albanian political parties, the Democratic Party of Albanians and the Party for Democratic Prosperity, in Ohrid and signed an agreement to end the conflict. By signing the Ohrid Agreement, representatives of the country's ethnic Albanian community agreed to disband the NLA, which was subsequently transformed into the Democratic Union for Integration, Macedonia's largest ethnic Albanian political party. Macedonia remained a unitary republic, but its constitution was altered to allow for affirmative action policies in the public sector that would benefit its ethnic Albanian population, as well as for wider use of the Albanian flag and language. In practice, this entailed the Macedonian government vowing to recognize Albanian as the second official language in areas where ethnic Albanians formed more than 20 percent of the population, recognizing and extending state support to the Albanian-language State University of Tetova, recruiting 1,000 ethnic Albanians into the Macedonian Police and offering an amnesty to all NLA members. On 19 August, Ahmeti announced the NLA would surrender its weapons to NATO. Most analysts agreed that the NLA had not fully respected the terms of the agreement and only surrendered a portion of its arms.

Legacy
The ethnic Albanian insurgency in Macedonia resulted in around 250 military and civilian fatalities on both the rebel and government sides. More than 170,000 civilians were displaced as a result of the conflict, 70,000 of whom fled to neighbouring Kosovo. By March 2002, around 140,000 refugees and internally displaced persons had returned to their homes.

In February 2014, the head of the Islamic Religious Community of Macedonia, Reis-ul-ulema Sulejman Rexhepi, wrote a Facebook post in which he accused the mayor of Prilep, Marjan Risteski, of taking part in the burning of Prilep's Charshi Mosque in August 2001. Rexhepi also asserted that all those who had taken part in its destruction had experienced divine retribution, and that the same fate would befall Risteski. "Many were eliminated among themselves, and not so long ago four of them lost their lives in car accidents," Rexhepi wrote. "The next to the last died yesterday on a motorcycle. The last of them, as it seems, is Marjan Risteski who will face ... punishment from the almighty Allah." Risteski was a veteran of the conflict, having been a member of the ARM at the time. Rexhepi's remarks were defended by Rexhepi's spokesman, Abaz Islami, who stated: "He has published only what has been determined by God." Risteski later stated that he had forgiven Rexhepi for what he had said. "In the spirit of Christianity I forgive him for his clumsy, reckless and unlucky statement," the mayor remarked. "I appeal to all who felt hurt by this statement to refrain from further reactions as its aim is to provoke problems." Igor Petreski, the head of the veterans' organization Karpalak, defended the mayor's wartime record and vouched that Risteski had been on the front lines in Tetovo the night the mosque was torched.

In the years following the ambush, the Macedonian authorities dedicated multiple plaques to commemorate the victims, most of which were later damaged or destroyed by unknown perpetrators. On the fifteenth anniversary of the attack, Jordan Trajkoski, a representative of the Association of Retired Reservist Army Soldiers, complained that the authorities had not done enough to memorialize the reservists.

See also
 Vejce ambush, a similar incident that took place in April 2001

References

2001 insurgency in Macedonia
Tetovo Municipality
Massacres in North Macedonia
August 2001 events in Europe
Ambushes in Europe